Take It from the Boys is the fifth studio album by American-Australian singer Marcia Hines and first on new record label Midnight Records. Take It from the Boys peaked at No. 16 in Australia and produced the top ten single, "Your Love Still Brings Me to My Knees" which peaked at No. 10 in Australia and  6 and 7 in The Netherlands and Belgium.

Track listing

Charts

References

External links

1981 albums
Marcia Hines albums
Albums produced by David Mackay (producer)